The following is a Western Armenian verb table.  The Eastern Armenian verb table can be found here:

Conjugations

Affirmative/Interrogative

Type I

Type II

Note: the forms khôsets'ay and khôsets'au are pronounced /khôsets'a/ and /khôsets'av/, respectively.

Type III

Note: the form gartay is pronounced /garta/.

Negative
Note: the formation of the negative is the same for all conjugations. The examples below are based on the first conjugation.

Armenian language

References